Jack Gentry may refer to:
 Jack Gentry (English cricketer)
 Jack Gentry (South African cricketer)
 Jack Gentry (entrepreneur)